The 2019 Elite One is the 59th season of Elite One, the top-tier football league in Cameroon. The season started on 2 February 2019.

First stage

Group A

Group B

Championship playoff

Relegation playoff

References

Elite One seasons
football
Cameroon